Pine is an unincorporated community in Baker County, Oregon, United States.

References 

Unincorporated communities in Baker County, Oregon
Unincorporated communities in Oregon